Pleurobema stabile, the Coosa pigtoe, was a species of freshwater mussel, an aquatic bivalve mollusk in the family Unionidae, the river mussels.

This species was endemic to the United States. Its natural habitat was rivers.

References

Extinct bivalves
stabile
Molluscs described in 1868
Taxonomy articles created by Polbot
Taxobox binomials not recognized by IUCN